Rosa Pavlovsky de Rosemberg (1862–1936) was a Russian-born Argentine physician.

Biography 
She was born in Taganrog to Santiago Pavlovsky and Agafia Gershova, Russian Jews who fled anti-Semitism in Russia and settled in Argentina along with their children. She devoted her career to pediatrics at the French Hospital in the City of Buenos Aires.  She completed her thesis in France and revalidated her credentials in Argentina.   She assisted in the fight against a cholera epidemic in Mendoza. She became Chief of Pediatrics and was decorated by the French government with the Legion of Honor.

References 

Argentine people of Russian-Jewish descent
Argentine women physicians
Emigrants from the Russian Empire to Argentina
Jewish physicians
1862 births
1936 deaths
Recipients of the Legion of Honour

People from Buenos Aires
20th-century Argentine physicians